Legends of Harley Drag Racing Museum is a museum located on the second floor of the Harley-Davidson dealership in Raleigh, North Carolina.  The museum was created by motorcycle drag racing champion, designer and Sturgis Motorcycle Museum & Hall of Fame inductee Ray Price and features displays of drag racing motorcycles along with memorabilia from multiple riders including Price. It is the only Harley-Davidson drag racing museum in the world.

References

Motorcycle drag racing
Museums in Raleigh, North Carolina
Automobile museums in North Carolina
Motorcycle museums in the United States
Sports museums in North Carolina